Nikola Damjanac (Serbian Cyrillic: Никола Дамјанац; born 21 October 1971) is a Serbian former professional footballer who played as a goalkeeper.

Playing career

Club career
After starting out at his hometown club Velež Mostar, Damjanac joined Partizan. He was loaned to OFK Beograd in the 1993–94 season, before returning to Stadion JNA. In the summer of 1997, Damjanac moved to the Netherlands and signed with Roda JC. He subsequently returned to Partizan in 1998. In the summer of 2000, Damjanac again moved abroad and joined Turkish side Antalyaspor. He left Turkey after one season and moved to Brazilian club Fluminense, alongside Miodrag Anđelković. Consequently, Damjanac briefly returned to OFK Beograd, before moving to Russian club Saturn Ramenskoye in the summer of 2002. He again returned to OFK Beograd in the 2004–05 season.

International career
In 1991, Damjanac made one appearance for the Yugoslavia U21s during the 1992 UEFA Under-21 Championship.

Post-playing career
After retiring as a player in 2005, Damjanac became a sports agent, being a co-owner of Lian Sports, alongside Fali Ramadani.

Personal life
His son is footballer Aleksa Damjanac.

Honours
Partizan
 First League of FR Yugoslavia: 1992–93, 1995–96, 1996–97, 1998–99

References

External links
 

Yugoslav footballers
Serbia and Montenegro footballers
Antalyaspor footballers
Association football goalkeepers
Campeonato Brasileiro Série A players
Eredivisie players
Expatriate footballers in Brazil
Expatriate footballers in Russia
Expatriate footballers in the Netherlands
Expatriate footballers in Turkey
FC Saturn Ramenskoye players
FK Partizan players
Fluminense FC players
OFK Beograd players
Roda JC Kerkrade players
Russian Premier League players
Serbia and Montenegro expatriate footballers
Serbia and Montenegro expatriate sportspeople in Brazil
Serbia and Montenegro expatriate sportspeople in Russia
Serbia and Montenegro expatriate sportspeople in the Netherlands
Serbia and Montenegro expatriate sportspeople in Turkey
Serbs of Bosnia and Herzegovina
Sportspeople from Mostar
Yugoslavia under-21 international footballers
1971 births
Living people